Magnolia, also known as Otts Mill, is an unincorporated community in Livingston Parish, Louisiana, United States.

Magnolia Baptist Church
Parish records indicate that the local Magnolia Baptist Church was built around 1919.

References

Unincorporated communities in Livingston Parish, Louisiana
Unincorporated communities in Louisiana